Newton Compton Editori, sometimes spelled Newton & Compton, is an Italian publisher.

The publisher was founded in Rome by Vittorio Avanzini in 1969. The house has published mostly paperbacks and low cost editions, including literature classics, essays and poetry. After devoting its activities mainly to reprints, starting from 2000s Newton Compton also publishes previously untranslated horror, science fiction, fantasy and historical novels by authors such as Simon Scarrow, Lisa J. Smith and Stuart MacBride. It has also published original works by Italian authors, including Andrea Frediani and Claudio Rendina.

External links
Official website

Italian publishers (people)
Publishing companies established in 1969